The Limon Wind Energy Center is a 600.6 megawatt (MW) wind farm in eastern Colorado near the town of Limon.  It became the largest wind facility in the state when construction completed in 2014.   The electricity is being sold to Xcel Energy under long-term power purchase agreements.

Facility details

The facility is located about 80 miles east of Denver.  It was constructed in three phases, and extends across western Lincoln County and crosses a few miles into Elbert County.  About 45 miles (72 km) of 345 kV transmission line connect the wind farm substations to the Xcel Energy substation near Deer Trail in Arapahoe County.

Limon I and Limon II were constructed by Blattner Energy, and came on line in late 2012.  The 400 MW facility consists of twin 200 MW projects,  each using 125 – GE 1.6 MW wind turbines that occupy more than 55,000 acres.   Two new substations were also constructed.

Limon III came into service in 2014 with an additional 200 MW of capacity.  It consists of 118 – GE 1.7 MW wind turbines occupying over 49,600 acres.  An approximately ten mile, 345 kV transmission line connects the Limon III substation to the Limon II substation. 

NextEra Energy Resources developed and financed,  and continues to own and operate the facility.

Electricity production 

(*) partial year of operation

See also

Wind power in Colorado
List of power stations in Colorado
List of wind farms in the United States

External links
 VIDEO: NextEra Energy Resources -- Limon Wind Energy Center

References

Energy infrastructure completed in 2012
Energy infrastructure completed in 2014
Wind farms in Colorado
Buildings and structures in Lincoln County, Colorado
Buildings and structures in Elbert County, Colorado
Buildings and structures in Arapahoe County, Colorado
NextEra Energy